I'm In Charge (Chinese: 小子当家) is a 20-episode Chinese drama serial that is shown on every weekday at 9pm on MediaCorp Channel 8. It airs from 27 May to 21 June 2013. It stars Sheila Sim , Elvin Ng , Aloysius Pang , Carole Lin & Rayson Tan as the casts of the series. It is shown on weekdays at 9pm, Channel U Every Weekday at 6pm from 25 January to 19 February 2016, and on Channel 8 Every Sunday at 12:30am from 2 January to 6 March 2022.

Plot

This is a 20-episode drama-series about a youth who has to shoulder the responsibility of being the man of the house while his mother is hospitalised. Not only does the boy have to support the family, he must also bear the responsibility of looking after his two younger sisters (one aged 14 and the other aged 12). The story underscores  the value of familial love and the need for young people to be independent and to have a sense of responsibility.

Wang Jiahao (Aloysius Pang) is a rebellious youth whose bad name causes him to be blacklisted by schools. In spite of that, his mother, Xiufen  (Carole Lin) does not give up hope on him. She works hard at two jobs just to admit him into a private school. But Jiahao does not appreciate his mother’s effort at all, living aimlessly day by day, with scant regard for his future until one day, his mother meets with an accident and lies unconscious in hospital indefinitely. Only then does Jiahao realise that he has to assume the heavy responsibility of being the “head of the family”.

Xiufen, while fending off a thief’s attempt to snatch her hard-earned $1000, is pushed down (by a thief) onto a hard pillar. Despite losing consciousness upon hitting her head and bleeding profusely, she still clutches onto her purse. Jiahao knows that the $1000 is meant for him; he had made an empty threat to leave home if Xiufen had refused to give him $1000 to buy a new computer. Staring at his unconscious mother, Jiahao has never felt so remorseful. He promises Xiufen to take good care of his two younger sisters so that she will see a complete family upon regaining consciousness.

Jiahao has a 14-year-old sister, Wang Jiemin (Foo Fang Rong) who is as rebellious as him, and an extremely mischievous but witty 12-year-old sister, Jieshan (Oh Ling En). He quickly feels the helplessness of managing the family and his two siblings - he does not even know how to boil water. The two rascals are simply too disobedient to him. And that's not the end - with the bad financial condition in the family after a housebreaker steals all the remaining money, Jiahao has to make ends meet.

Fortunately, Jiahao has a warm and motherly paternal aunt, Wang Xiaohui (Sheila Sim). She volunteers to move in with the children and claims that she will take “good” care of them. However, this aunt is a scatterbrain. She is eager to help but always messes things up. Not only does Xiaohui cook a meal that tastes awful, she almost causes the whole family to die of gas poisoning.

Jiahao has no choice but to “head the family”. He has to see to everything – from doing the basic of preparing three meals a day to washing the laundry, clearing the choked toilet bowl, emptying the rubbish, buying toilet paper, trimming his sister's hair, meeting the teachers, etc. As if this string of duties is not enough, he also has to find time to visit his eccentric maternal grandfather. Only then does it dawn on him that his mother had been a “superwoman”, a multi-tasker; her children do nothing but rely on Xiufen for food and money. He finally understands his mother’s pains of looking after them.

Xiufen has left little money for them. Auntie cannot even pay her mountain of credit card debts, let alone help them financially. Jiahao has no choice but to work during his school vacation. While working at a restaurant in a swimming club, he is mesmerised by a pretty girl in swimwear.

The girl is Jiang Haiying (Elizabeth Lee), a sweet girl with a fantastic figure. In the water, she is like a mermaid. Out of the water, she is bubbly and cheerful. But she is a top student of a prestigious school, and a swimming captain to boot. Her father is a well-known lawyer. He is nothing compared to her. Moreover, Jiahao has a secret - he has a phobia of entering a pool as a result of a childhood incident where he nearly drowned. This is his secret that cannot be revealed, yet the girl he is fond of is a “mermaid”. Jiahao has the courage only to enjoy watching her in stealth but not to take any action. One day, Jiahao happens to see Haiying struggling in the water due to a leg cramp. Seeing that nobody else is in sight, he jumps into the pool to save her without considering his own safety. Unfortunately, Haiying ends up saving him instead. It is “a blessing in disguise”, and Jiahao befriends Haiying. He also finds out that like him, Haiying has “a secret that cannot be revealed”.

On the home front, Jiahao is in a fix. Jiemin wants to wear a nose stud. He opposes it vehemently for fear that Xiufen will wake up to see Jiemin turned into a young punk. JIemin's response that “Mother may never wake up again!” incurs his wrath.  After retorting that “You have never behaved like an elder brother”, she leaves home.

In the midst of facing a deluge of problems, his maternal uncle Ah Wei (Elvin Ng) appears at the flat. He is homeless after being released from prison. Xiaohui is afraid that Ah Wei, with his secret society background, will lead Jiahao astray. She is determined to stop Ah Wei from moving in but the thick-skinned latter refuses to leave.  In a quick change of heart, Xiaohui also moves in to set herself against Ah Wei. Both parties are hostile to each other and are often at loggerheads. Sandwiched between them, Jiahao can only agonise.  Around this time, a man claiming to be their future father appears out of nowhere, making this messy family even more “exciting”.

Jiahao tries his best to overcome the various obstacles. His efforts are not futile in the end. He succeeds as “head of the family”, and in “pairing up” Ah Wei and Xiaohui. His mother awakens to see her son changed for the better and a family full of warmth.

Cast
Elvin Ng as Liu Guowei 刘国威
Sheila Sim as Wang Xiaohui 王小慧 or Chili Padi
Aloysius Pang as Wang Jiahao 王家豪 
Foo Fang Rong as Wang Jiemin 王洁敏
Oh Ling En as Wang Jieshan 王洁珊
Elizabeth Lee as Jiang Haiying 江海瑛
Rayson Tan as Director Yang 杨大导
Hao Hao as Lin Chunfeng 林春风
Darryl Yong as Albert Chang
Carole Lin as Liu Xiufen 刘秀芬
Eric Lee as Lollipop
Jasper Chua as Otahman
Melody Low as Coco
Charles Phua as Benson Lee
Li Wenhai  as Niu Pi Gu 牛霹辜
Chua En Lai as Matino

Trivia
Carole Lin's comeback drama after My Buddy (2009).
Sheila Sim's first crossover to acting from modelling.
Chua En Lai's first Mandarin drama.
In episode 15, there was a scene where Guowei and Jiemin were watching It Takes Two, the first drama where Ang Eng Tee and Chong Liung Man, this drama's scriptwriter and executive producer respectively, worked together.
In episode 21 of 118, Dennis Chew is seen watching an episode where Elvin Ng does the GPMG fist, and decides to try it out.
In episode 162 of 118, Dennis Chew does the GPMG fist after remembering the scene where Elvin Ng does the GPMG fist, which is actually seen in the series.

Overseas broadcast
This drama is tenth drama on Malaysian satellite television Astro to be broadcast concurrently with Singapore, two weeks' behind the original telecast.

Awards & Nominations

Star Awards 2014
I'm in Charge garnered 2 nominations for 3 awards in the Star Awards, for the Young Talent Award, Favourite Male Character.

See also
 List of I'm in Charge episodes
 List of programmes broadcast by Mediacorp Channel 8

References

2013 Singaporean television series debuts
2013 Singaporean television series endings
Channel 8 (Singapore) original programming
Channel U (Singapore) original programming